The Emperor of Paris is a 2018 French historical drama film directed by Jean-François Richet and written by Éric Besnard and Richet.

Plot 
The film is about an ex-con turned police officer. Under the reign of Napoleon, Francois Vidocq cuts a notorious figure in the Parisian underworld - he is the only man to have escaped the country's most terrifying penal colonies. However, some years later, he switched sides and gets hired as a detective in the French police. He founded his own private detective agency and became one of the greatest detectives of all times. However, his dark past still follows him...

Cast 

 Vincent Cassel as Eugène-François Vidocq
 Freya Mavor as Annette
 Denis Ménochet as Dubillard
 August Diehl as Nathanael de Wenger
 James Thierrée as Duke of Neufchâteau
 Patrick Chesnais as M. Henry
 Olga Kurylenko as Baroness Roxane of Giverny
 Fabrice Luchini as Joseph Fouché
 Denis Lavant as Maillard
 Jérôme Pouly as Courtaux
 Antoine Basler as Perrin

Release
The film premiered at the Arras Film Festival on 3 November 2018. It was later released in France and Belgium on 19 December 2018, followed by other countries on later dates.

References

External links 

2018 films
2018 biographical drama films
2018 drama films
French biographical drama films
2010s French-language films
Films set in Paris
Films set in the 1800s
Films set in 1807
Films set in the 1810s
Films shot in France
Films directed by Jean-François Richet
Films scored by Marco Beltrami
Cultural depictions of Eugène François Vidocq
2010s French films